César Rafael Haydar Villarreal (born 31 March 2001) is a Colombian footballer who plays for Atlético Junior on loan from Red Bull Bragantino as a central defender.

Club career
Haydar was born in Suán, Atlántico Department, and started his career with local side Asefusa FC. In 2018 he joined Atlético Junior and was immediately assigned to their reserve team, Barranquilla FC, in the Categoría Primera B.

Haydar made his senior debut on 1 August 2018, starting in a 1–1 away draw against Cúcuta Deportivo. Promoted to the first team the following March, he made his Categoría Primera A debut on 30 March 2019, playing the full 90 minutes in a draw at Jaguares de Córdoba for the same scoreline.

Personal life
Haydar's uncle Alberto was also a footballer and a defender. He too represented Junior in the 90s, but died in 2015.

References

External links

2001 births
Living people
People from Atlántico Department
Colombian footballers
Colombian people of Syrian descent
Association football defenders
Categoría Primera A players
Categoría Primera B players
Barranquilla F.C. footballers
Atlético Junior footballers
Red Bull Bragantino players
Campeonato Brasileiro Série A players
Colombian expatriate footballers
Expatriate footballers in Brazil